Unchahar is a town and nagar panchayat in Raebareli district in the Indian state of Uttar Pradesh. It serves as the headquarters of a tehsil as well as a community development block. It is located on Lucknow Allahabad Highway, 115 km from Lucknow, 85 km from Allahabad. The place is well connected by rail and roads to nearby cities of Kanpur, Lucknow, and Allahabad. Unchahar is also a constituency of  Uttar Pradesh Legislative assembly (183 Unchahar Vidhan Sabha).

Unchahar changed dramatically after the work done by former Member of Legislative Assembly, Har Narayan Singh. Some of his work include the establishment of the well known Feroze Gandhi Thermal Power Station of the National Thermal Power Corporation, which now has an installed capacity of 1050 MW and the launching of the daily train "Unchahar Express" connecting Allahabad with Chandigarh.

Basic public amenities are not so good despite the NTPC power plant, electricity supply is poor, although it is an important landmark in Raibareli.

Geography
Unchahar is a town in the fertile Awadh region of Uttar Pradesh. The river Ganga flows 7 km southwest to the town. Unchahar has a humid subtropical climate with cool, dry winters from November to February and dry, hot summers from April to June. The rainy season is from July to mid-September. Fog is a common phenomenon from late December to late January. Unchahar is located 38 km from the district headquarters of the Raebareli. It has an average elevation of 111 metres. The dialect spoken here is the Awadhi variety of the Hindi language.

History
The 1961 census recorded Unchahar as comprising 30 hamlets, with a total population of 4,109 people (2,139 male and 1,970 female), in 848 households and 822 physical houses. The area of the village was given as 3,490 acres and it had a library and a medical practitioner at that point.

The 1981 census recorded Unchahar as having a population of 7,282 people, in 1,852 households, and having an area of 1,412.36 hectares. The main staple foods were listed as wheat and rice.

The Feroze Gandhi Unchahar Thermal Power Station began operation in 1988 with five units each capable of generating 210 MW of electricity. Construction cost Rs. 219 crores. A sixth unit, generating 500 MW of electricity, commenced operation in March 2017. On 1 November 2017, the new unit's boiler pipe exploded, killing 32 people and injuring many more.

Demographics

According to the 2011 census, Unchahar has a population of 11,033 people, in 1,866 households. The town's sex ratio is 969 females to every 1000 males, which is higher than the district-wide urban sex ratio of 924; 5,602 of Unchahar's residents are male (50.8%) and 5,431 are female (49.2%). The 0-6 age group makes up about 13.0% of the town's population; the sex ratio for this group is 1003, which is the highest among towns in Raebareli district. Members of Scheduled Castes make up 4.45% of the town's population, while no members of Scheduled Tribes were recorded. Unchahar's literacy rate was 80.88% (counting only people age 7 and up); literacy was higher among men and boys (86.45%) than among women and girls (75.1%). The scheduled castes literacy rate is 71.08% (77.68% among men and boys, and 63.35% among women and girls).

In terms of employment, 18.22% of Unchahar residents were classified as main workers (i.e. people employed for at least 6 months per year) in 2011. Marginal workers (i.e. people employed for less than 6 months per year) made up 9.21%, and the remaining 72.57% were non-workers. Employment status varied considerably according to gender, with 46.32% of men being either main or marginal workers, compared to just 7.94% of women.

4.12% of Dalmau residents live in slum conditions as of 2011. There is 1 slum area in Unchahar, called Aliganj. This has an approximate population of 455 residents and has 4 tap water access points. The number of flush toilets installed in people's homes is 12. The area is serviced by open sewers.

Available banks
Axis Bank
State Bank of India Market Branch
State Bank of India NTPC Branch 
Bandhan Bank
Dena Bank
Baroda Gramin Bank Khojanpur 
Allahabad Bank
United Bank of India 
Bank of Baroda
Punjab National Bank 
Vijaya Bank
HDFC Bank
UCO Bank
Zila Sahkari Bank

Transport
Unchahar Junction railway station is the main Junction railway station after Rae Bareli Junction railway station. It is located on Varanasi–Kanpur and Varanasi–Lucknow line. Unchahar Express is the only direct connected to Chandigarh.

Villages
Unchahar CD block has the following 107 villages:

See also

 Rae Bareli (Lok Sabha constituency)
 2017 NTPC power plant explosion

References

Cities and towns in Raebareli district